Ranks of the People's Liberation Army may refer to the following:
Ranks of the People's Liberation Army Ground Force
Ranks of the People's Liberation Army Navy
Ranks of the People's Liberation Army Air Force